Jamie Harper (born September 11, 1989) is a former American football running back. He was drafted by the Tennessee Titans in the fourth round of the 2011 NFL Draft. He played college football for the Clemson Tigers.

High school career
Harper attended Trinity Christian Academy in Jacksonville, Florida, where he graduated in 2008. While at Trinity, Harper rushed for 1,437 yards and 19 touchdowns as a senior and 1,200 rushing yards and 17 touchdowns along with four receiving touchdowns as a junior. Rated as the No. 12 prospect in the nation by ESPN.com, No. 3 running back in the nation by ESPN.com, No. 5 running back and No. 35 prospect in the nation by Scout.com and No. 119 prospect in the nation by Rivals.com. He played in the ESPN/Under Armour All-American game and scored the winning touchdown on a pass with less than three minutes left in the game, topping it off with his signature front flip.

College career
Harper fumbled on his first career carry at Clemson. During his recruiting pitch, Clemson coach Tommy Bowden promised Harper he would get the first carry of the season, regardless of the circumstances. Bowden had made similar promises while recruiting James Davis and C. J. Spiller.

Professional career
After his junior season,  Harper announced that he would forgo his senior season and enter the 2011 NFL Draft.
Harper was selected by the Tennessee Titans with the 130th pick in the fourth round of the 2011 NFL Draft.

Jamie Harper signed a 4 year, $2,340,580 contract with the Tennessee Titans, including a $300,580 signing bonus, $300,580 guaranteed, and an average annual salary of $585,145.

References

External links
 
 Clemson Tigers bio
 Tennessee Titans bio

1989 births
Living people
American football running backs
Clemson Tigers football players
Under Armour All-American football players
Sportspeople from Waco, Texas
Tennessee Titans players
Players of American football from Texas
Players of American football from Jacksonville, Florida